Dohop is an Icelandic technology company based in Reykjavík, Iceland. Founded in 2004 as a travel search engine to aggregate and link low-cost flight connections, in 2005, Dohop launched the world's first flight planner for low-cost airlines and later expanded it to include all scheduled flights worldwide, amounting to 660 airlines.

Dohop is primarily a long tail aggregation agent that does not sell directly to the consumer, but refers the user to airline's booking engines. Dohop's income comes from pay per click advertising and from selling specialized search engines to airlines and airports. The company also operates an analytics department, offering route network analysis and optimization suggestions to airlines and airports.

In 2006, Travelmole the company won the Web Awards in the category for best technology site, and was selected as one of the Times Magazine 100 best travel sites in 2007.

Dohop also draws its income, thanks to its technological license on this concept of search engine: In 2012, Dohop opens an affiliation program. Professionals can set up a Dohop-identified flight search engine on their own website.

In 2014, Dohop won the World's Leading Flight Comparison Website award at the World Travel Awards and subsequently won the award three years in a row in 2016, 2017, and 2018.

Dohop has since transitioned to becoming a technology provider for the aviation and travel industry, building virtual interline connections for airlines such as easyJet and Air Transat, as well as intermodal technologies connecting easyJet and Deutsche Bahn through Berlin Brandenburg Airport.

References

External links 
 Dohop website

Icelandic travel websites
Software companies of Iceland
Travel ticket search engines
Internet properties established in 2004
Icelandic brands